Kapčiamiestis is a town in Lithuania located near the confluence of Baltoji Ančia and Nieda Rivers.

History
Kapčiamiestis traces its history dating back in the early 16th century, then a manor was built. In 1777 a parish-school was opened here.

In the town's cemetery, Polish-Lithuanian national hero, Emilia Plater, was buried in 1831.
The town had an important Jewish community. The Germans entered the town on 22 June 1941. On 15 September 1941, all of the Jews were taken under high security to Lazdijai. There they were put into a ghetto established in Katkishes, one kilometer outside of Lazdijai, where Jews from neighboring villages were interned. On 3 November 1941 the Jews of Kapčiamiestis were murdered with the rest of the ghetto inhabitants. Kapčiamiestis was devastated by World War II, after which most of the historical buildings were destroyed.

References 

Towns in Lithuania
Towns in Alytus County
Suwałki Governorate
Holocaust locations in Lithuania